Vrinda Bhagat (born 26 January 1959) is a former Test and One Day International cricketer who represented India. She played a total of two Tests and 11 ODIs.

References

1959 births
India women One Day International cricketers
India women Test cricketers
Indian women cricketers
Living people